Hon. Mutahi Kagwe is the former cabinet secretary for Health in the Republic of Kenya. He assumed office on 28 February 2020 after the docket was handed over to him by the previous cabinet secretary for Health, Sicily Kariuki. He hit the airwaves at the onset of the COVID-19 pandemic when the first case was confirmed in Nairobi on 12 March 2020  following the outbreak in Wuhan, China in December 2019. As the pandemic intensified, the government of Kenya imposed lockdowns in the virus hotspot areas, dusk-to-dawn curfews, travel bans, and other restrictions to try to contain the spread of COVID-19. He was succeeded by Susan Nakhumicha Wafula on 31 October 2022.

Education 
Hon. Mutahi Kagwe was born in 1958  and he attended his early education at Kihate Primary School from 1965 - 1971. He later joined Kagumo High School in 1972 - 1977 to pursue his O levels and A levels. Kagwe would later join the University of Nairobi from 1978 - 1981 where he graduated with a Bachelor of Commerce (Insurance) degree. He took further studies at the United States International University from 1988 - 1992 and graduated with an MBA.

Professional career 
Before Kagwe got into politics he was in private business and had an independent publishing house as well as a public relations company. Between 1987 and 1989 he was working with the Standard Media Group's advertising department where he rose to the position of commercial director of the institution. Outside of politics he has held and continues to hold many positions including, chairman of several corporate boards. He is also the former Multimedia University Council Chairman. He is a professional member of the Marketing Society of Kenya, the Kenya Institute of Management, the parliamentarian network of the World Bank, and the Commonwealth Parliamentary Association.

Political career 
Kagwe's political journey began in the year 2002 when he became the fifth member of parliament for Mukurweini Constituency in Nyeri County on a National Rainbow Coalition (NARC) party ticket. As a member of parliament, he was the chair of the parliamentary committee on Finance, Trade, Tourism, and Planning.

In the year 2005, Kagwe was appointed to the cabinet as the minister of Information, Communication and Technology (ICT) by the late former President Mwai Kibaki. In this position, he, along with the former permanent secretary for the Ministry of Information, Communications and Technology, Dr. Bitange Ndemo, spearheaded the construction of The East African Marine System (TEAMS), which was the first fiber-optic project for Eastern Africa. This saw Kenya taking up the use of fiber-optic cables, leading to a great transformation in communication because there was a reduction of call tariffs across the different telecommunication network providers and a spiral of internet speeds.

It is also worth mentioning that Vodafone and Safaricom launched Mpesa, the world's first-ever mobile money transfer system, in Kenya during his term.

Kagwe tried to retain his parliamentary seat during the 2007 Kenyan general elections but he lost it to Kabando wa Kabando. He then disappeared from the limelight and made a comeback in the 2013 Kenyan General Elections to run for a seat in the Senate of Kenya on a NARC party ticket. He won and became the first senator of Nyeri County.

He assumed office as the senator of Nyeri county in March 2013. During his term, his achievements included the championing of “The Best Classroom,” an Early Childhood Education program that aspires to promote the quality provision of ECDE nationwide. He is also credited with having sponsored the Cyber Security and Protection Bill in the Senate of Kenya.

In the 2017 Kenyan general elections, he pursued the Nyeri gubernatorial seat on a Jubilee party ticket, which he lost. In 2019 he was appointed to the board of the Energy and Petroleum Regulatory Authority (EPRA).

After being appointed the cabinet secretary for Health in February 2020, beginning in March 2020, he led Kenya's National Emergency Response Committee in its fight against the COVID-19 pandemic. His efforts, amid countless domestic and local challenges, earned him International recognition in the Wall Street Journal.

Personal life 
Mutahi Kagwe's wife is Anne Wanjiku Mutahi, a soft-spoken financial expert. She is the daughter of the former Environment minister, the late John Michuki. She has served in many firms and has been an advisor on Small and Medium-sized Enterprises (SMEs) in former President Uhuru Kenyatta’s government. They have four children, namely Kagwe, Njoroge, Nyawira, and Kahumburu. His son Kagwe, whose stage name is Kahu$h, is a Kenyan musician who rose to prominence during the Covid-19 pandemic. He is also the uncle of Kagwe Mungai, another popular Kenyan musician.

References

External links

1959 births
Members of the Senate of Kenya
Government ministers of Kenya
University of Nairobi alumni
Members of the National Assembly (Kenya)
United States International University alumni
Living people